Wahlenbergia nodosa (known as the Mouse-spoon Capebell or Muistepelkaroo) is a herbaceous plant in the family Campanulaceae native to the dry karoo regions of South Africa.

This species is similar to, and often confused with, Wahlenbergia tenella and Wahlenbergia tenerrima.

References

nodosa
Flora of South Africa
Renosterveld